Dicksonfjorden is a fjord branch of Isfjorden at Spitsbergen, Svalbard. It is located between  James I Land and Dickson Land, and is named after Swedish Baron Oscar Dickson.

References

Fjords of Spitsbergen